William Alexander McGilvray (April 29, 1883 – May 23, 1952) was a professional baseball player.  He was an outfielder for one season (1908) with the Cincinnati Reds.  For his career, he compiled no hits in 2 at-bats.

An alumnus of Stanford University, he was born in Portland, Oregon and died in Denver Colorado at the age of 69.

External links

1883 births
1952 deaths
Cincinnati Reds players
Major League Baseball outfielders
St. Joseph Saints players
Des Moines Underwriters players
Pueblo Indians players
Seattle Siwashes players
Harrisburg Senators players
Milwaukee Brewers (minor league) players
Birmingham Barons players
Troy Trojans (minor league) players
Stanford Cardinal baseball players
Baseball players from Portland, Oregon
Douglas Miners players